Paradiso is a song by Marika Gombitová released on Jumbo Records in 1994.

The music for the lyrics by Kamil Peteraj wrote the singer, while a video was directed by Katarína Ďurovičová, winning in addition the annual Zlatý Triangel award in 1995. Apart from being issued on the artist's nine studio set Zostaň.

Official versions
 "Paradiso" - Studio version, 1994

Credits and personnel
 Marika Gombitová - lead vocal, music
 Vašo Patejdl - arranger, programming, keyboards, chorus
 Štefan Hegeds - arranger, programming, keyboards
 Henry Tóth - guitars
 Jana Kütreiberová - chorus
 Elena Matušová - chorus
 Marcel Palonder - chorus
 Jozef Krajčovič - sound director, technical coordination, mix
 Relax H&V - studio

Awards

Triangel
Zlatý Triangel was an annual video chart also broadcast by the public television network Slovenská televízia from 1984 to 1997. The show, originally hosted by Tatiana Kulíšková and Pavol Juráň, and since November 1989 by Daniel Junas, awarded exclusively Slovak and Czech artists for the best videos released in a calendar year, similarly as the MTV music channel. Prior to that, its monthly editions called Triangel were held. In total, Gombitová won four annual charts (in 1985-86, 1988 and 1995).

References

General

Specific

1994 songs
1994 singles
Marika Gombitová songs
Songs written by Marika Gombitová
Songs written by Kamil Peteraj
Slovak-language songs